Enrique A. Gainzarain (7 December 1904 – 18 July 1972) was an Argentine association football player who played a single official game for Argentina in the 1928 Summer Olympics.

Gainzarain joined River Plate at the age of 10 and made his senior debut in 1920. He went on to play for Ferro Carril Oeste and Gimnasia y Esgrima de La Plata.

References

External links
Diego Estévez; Sergio Lodise, 105. Historia de un siglo rojo y blanco, Ediciones Continente,  
profile
Statistics at Once-onze.narod.ru 
Club Atlético River Plate: La mejor cantera del mundo, lejos (in Spanish)

1904 births
1972 deaths
Argentine footballers
Argentine people of Basque descent
Association football inside forwards
Club Atlético River Plate footballers
Ferro Carril Oeste footballers
Club de Gimnasia y Esgrima La Plata footballers
Footballers at the 1928 Summer Olympics
Olympic footballers of Argentina
Olympic silver medalists for Argentina
Argentina international footballers
Olympic medalists in football
Medalists at the 1928 Summer Olympics